Michael Bracewell (born 7 August 1958) is a British writer and novelist.  He was born in London, and educated at the University of Nottingham, graduating in English and American Studies.

A comprehensive collection of Bracewell's essays can be found in The Space Between: Selected Writings on Art, edited by Doro Globus and published by Ridinghouse in 2012.

He is perhaps best known for his 1997 collection, England Is Mine: Pop Life in Albion From Wilde to Goldie.

Bibliography

Fiction
Missing Margate (1988)
The Crypto-Amnesia Club (1988)
The Quick End (1988)
Divine Concepts of Physical Beauty (1989)
The Conclave (1992)
Saint Rachel (1995)
Perfect Tense (2001)
Unfinished Business (2023)
Non-fiction
The Faber Book of Pop (contributor) (1995)
England Is Mine: Pop Life in Albion From Wilde to Goldie (1997)
The Penguin Book of Twentieth-Century Fashion Writing (contributor) (1999)
Wrote introduction to Jeff Noon's Cobralingus (2001)
The Nineties: When Surface was Depth (2002)
I Know Where I'm Going: A Guide to Morecambe & Heysham (co-author) (2003)
Roxyism (2004)
Roxy Music: Bryan Ferry, Brian Eno, Art, Ideas and Fashion (2005)
The Edgier Waters (contributor) (2006)
Re-make/Re-model: Becoming Roxy Music (2007)
Introduction to the Sotheby's catalogue for Damien Hirst's sale: Beautiful Inside My Head Forever, an introduction (2008)
The Space Between: Selected Writings on Art (2012)
 What Is Gilbert & George? (2017)
Modern World: The Art of Richard Hamilton (2021)
Souvenir (2021)

References

External links
 Interview
 The Times on Michael Bracewell
 

1958 births
Living people
20th-century English novelists
Alumni of the University of Nottingham
English non-fiction writers
English male novelists
Writers from London
20th-century English male writers
English male non-fiction writers